Following the Russian invasion of Ukraine on 24 February 2022, the Ukrainian city of Zaporizhzhia and the surrounding region became the target of repeated Russian shelling and bombing (including cruise missiles, S-300 missiles and Shahed-136 kamikaze drones) as part of the southern Ukraine offensive from 27 February 2022 onwards.

Background 
Ukraine was invaded by the Russian armed forces on 24 February 2022 with the Russian 22nd Army Corps advancing north from Crimea towards the city of Zaporizhzhia, which holds a strategic position along the Dnieper River in Central Ukraine, and is the administrative centre of the Zaporizhzhia Oblast. By 26 February, Russian forces began to approach the Zaporizhzhia Nuclear Power Plant, with fighting between Ukrainian and Russian troops being reported on the southern outskirts of the city the following day. No casualties were reported in the aftermath of the confrontation. Later that evening, the Russians began shelling the city for the first time since the start of the war.

Timeline

March 

The Zaporizhzhia Nuclear Power Plant was subjected to Russian shelling during the night of 3 March, resulting in a fire at the plant which was brought under control by the next morning. That same day the plant fell under control of the Russian forces following the Battle of Enerhodar.

Around 5am on 16 March the Zaporizhzhia-2 railway station was targeted by a Russian rocket attack, significantly damaging the tracks and overhead lines, as well as blowing out the building's windows. The trains which were present at the station at the time also sustained broken windows. No one was injured or killed in the attack, and all train traffic was subsequently handled by Zaporizhzhia-1 railway station.

April 
Residents reported feeling and hearing explosions in various parts of the city on 7 April. These explosions had been the result of the Zaporizhzhia air defense forces successfully shooting down three Russian cruise missiles, preventing any potential ground casualties and/or injuries.

On 21 April, two Russian cruise missiles were fired towards Zaporizhzhia. The first missile came down near the island of Khortytsia in the vicinity of the Preobrazhensky Bridges (Preobrazhensky Bridge) at 12.45pm. At that time, a passenger train serving the line between Zaporizhzhia and Lviv was traveling on the tracks of the bridge and was caught in the blast. The windows of four carriages were blown out as a result of the explosion's shock wave. The second missile also came down near Khortytsia at 1.30pm, resulting in damage to a Sanatorium (Sanatoriy-Profilaktoriy Ztr) building on the island. The attacks resulted in eight injuries, all of whom were civilians.

In the morning of 26 April, two Russian 3M-54 Kalibr guided missiles hit the city while a third missile exploded mid-air. The missile strike caused damage to a factory which had been out of operation and killed one civilian while injuring three others. Two days later on the morning of 28 April, another missile strike was conducted on the city by a Kh-55 air-to-surface missile. The strike destroyed two private residences resulting in three casualties.

May 
At 11pm on 12 May, a Russian cruise missile hit the island of Khortytsia, causing a small fire at the impact site. No infrastructure damage or casualties were reported.

Four more cruise missiles were launched at Zaporizhzhia on 25 May. While one missile was shot down by the city's air defences, the other three struck civilian sites in the Shevchenkivskyi district and the shopping center in the Oleksandrivskyi district, resulting in one civilian death and 3 wounded.

July 
On 13 July, two Russian cruise missiles hit a factory in the Dnipro district of the city, wounding 14 civilians.

August 
On 6 August, explosions were reported near the Zaporizhzhia Nuclear Power Plant from apparent shelling. A high-voltage power line transformer was damaged in the explosion, resulting in the automatic shutdown of reactor number 3 and the start-up of its emergency generators.

One civilian was killed and two others injured when five Russian shells were fired at Zaporizhzhia at 7.15pm on 12 August. Further city infrastructure in the Shevchenkivskyi district was also damaged in the shelling.

September 

During the night of 19 September, Zaporizhzhia was hit by eight Russian rockets in its industrial and residential areas. Followed by another rocket attack in the morning, striking the regional center near the Dnieper river. Two days later the city was again hit by two Russian rockets during the night, followed by another five rockets attacks in the daytime. The regional center was hit an additional two times while other infrastructure and residential houses were damaged, two of the projectiles landed in a field on the outskirts of the city. The attack wounded three civilians. The following day on 22 September, nine more rockets were fired at the city. One of the projectiles hit a hotel in the city's central park, killing one civilian and injuring five others. An electrical substation and several high-rise residential buildings were also damaged. Later that same day, ten more rockets struck the city and damaged about a dozen private homes. Further shelling on the morning of 24 September saw five projectiles hit the city, causing damage to residential buildings as well as injuring 9 civilians while killing one.

On the morning of 27 September, Zaporizhzhia was struck by ten S-300 missiles. Besides damaging infrastructure, the attack also damaged power lines resulting in a fire.

A civilian humanitarian convoy was hit by several Russian S-300 missiles on 30 September, killing 32 civilians while wounding around 90 others.

October 

At 5.08am on 6 October, seven Russian rockets were fired towards the city center of Zaporizhzhia. Several residential buildings were destroyed and fires broke out due to the attack, killing 17 civilians and injuring 12 more.

Zaporizhzhia was attacked once more during the night of 7 October, but this time by Iranian Shahed-136 kamikaze drones used by the Russian forces. The attack resulted in the deaths of 12 civilians with a further 13 injured and 15 missing. That same day around 10am, another Russian attack struck the city with one of the rockets landing in the courtyard of a high-rise building. The attack damaged the building and injured one civilian.

Around 3am on 9 October, 12 Russian tactical missiles were launched against civilian infrastructure in Zaporizhzhia. Most missiles hit both high-rise buildings and residential houses, with a nine-story building being partially destroyed after the attack. A further five high-rise buildings, 20 residential houses and four schools were damaged alongside 20 cars. A total of 13 civilians were killed in the attack, while 89 more were injured.

The following day at 1.45am, about seven Russian S-300 anti-aircraft missiles struck the city resulting in the deaths of eight civilians.

Russian forces continuously targeted Zaporizhzhia with about 19 S-300 missiles and four Shahed-136 kamikaze drones during the nights from 11 to 15 October. Many residential buildings were damaged alongside other city infrastructure and several cars. The human cost of the continuous attacks came down to one civilian casualty and three more wounded.

Another string of attacks occurred during the nights from 17 to 19 October, seeing at least seven S-300 missiles hitting both civilian and industrial infrastructure and several kamikaze drones hitting the regional center. No deaths or injuries were reported. Two days later on 21 October at around 8.30am, another six Russian S-300 missiles targeted the city, damaging more residential buildings as well as a school. Five civilians received injuries in the attack.

On 31 October around 8am, several rockets were launched from a Russian aircraft, followed by another attack by Russian S-300 missiles at 10am. The city's infrastructure again received damage, including damage to several high-rise buildings, a hospital, a school and a cultural center. As a result of the shelling, many of the city's residents were left without electricity or running water.

November 
On 6 November around 12.34am, two S-300 missiles were fired at the city's regional center. One of the missiles fell in a residential quarter, damaging private residences as well as two cars, and causing a fire. The other exploded in a privately owned field. One person was killed by the shelling.

On 18 November at 10.35pm, five S-300 missiles were launched at Zaporizhzhia. The attack damaged a factory and several high-rise buildings, killing one person. In the aftermath of the attack, over 120 residential buildings were left without heating. The heating issue was resolved in the stricken high-rise buildings by the following day.

18 November- presents 

Since February 2022, Zaporozhye has been shelled almost every day. As a result, many people were killed and a significant part of the city was damaged.

References

21st-century mass murder in Ukraine
Airstrikes during the 2022 Russian invasion of Ukraine
February 2022 events in Ukraine
March 2022 events in Ukraine
April 2022 events in Ukraine
May 2022 events in Ukraine
July 2022 events in Ukraine
August 2022 events in Ukraine
September 2022 events in Ukraine
October 2022 events in Ukraine
Southern Ukraine campaign
History of Zaporizhzhia
War crimes during the 2022 Russian invasion of Ukraine
Zaporizhzhia
Mass murder in 2022
February 2022 crimes in Europe
March 2022 crimes in Europe
April 2022 crimes in Europe
May 2022 crimes in Europe
July 2022 crimes in Europe
August 2022 crimes in Europe
September 2022 crimes in Europe
October 2022 crimes in Europe
Airstrikes conducted by Russia
Attacks on buildings and structures in 2022
Attacks on buildings and structures in Ukraine
Russian war crimes in Ukraine
2020s in Ukraine
2022 in Ukraine
History of Europe
2022 in Europe
Mass murder in Ukraine
History of Ukraine
Airstrikes in Europe
November 2022 crimes in Europe
November 2022 events in Ukraine